El Cuervo de Sevilla is a Spanish municipality located in the province of Seville, in Andalusia. It has a population of 8,628 (in 2018) and an area of 31 km². It's 72 km from the provincial capital, Seville.
El Cuervo de Sevilla means "The Crow of Seville" in Spanish. That is why the flag and seal both have a crow on it.

References

External links
 Ayuntamiento de El Cuervo de Sevilla 
 El Cuervo de Sevilla at the Instituto de Estadística de Andalucía 

Municipalities of the Province of Seville